Pedro Muñoz Seca (20 February 1879 – 28 November 1936 ) was a Spanish comic playwright. He was one of the most successful playwrights of his era.  He wrote approximately 300 dramatic works, both sainetes (short vignettes) and longer plays, often in collaboration with Pedro Pérez Fernández or Enrique García Álvarez. His most ambitious and best known play is La venganza de Don Mendo (Don Mendo's Revenge, 1918); other major works include La barba de Carrillo (Carrillo's Beard, 1918) and Pepe Conde (1920).

Early life and career

Muñoz Seca was born into a large family in El Puerto de Santa María, Cadiz, Spain, on 20 February 1879. (Because Muñoz Seca loved palindromic numbers, however, he often claimed that he was born in 1881.  He also claimed to have been born at 10:15 pm, "the normal time for shows to start".) Muñoz Seca attended primary school at the Jesuit school of San Luis Gonzaga in El Puerto de Santa María. He then moved to Seville to study philosophy and law; he graduated in 1901. While Muñoz Seca was still a student, his first plays premiered in El Puerto de Santa María (República estudiantil, Un Perfecto de pasivas, and El señor de Pilili) and in Seville (Las Guerreras).

After his graduation, Muñoz Seca moved to Madrid. There, he taught Latin, Greek, and Hebrew and later would work as a lawyer. He often attended literary society meetings, and there met Sebastian Alonso.  The two collaborated on the play El Contrabando, which premiered in 1904. Muñoz Seca entered public service in 1908, taking a post in the Ministry of Public Works and Transport. Soon thereafter, he married María Asunción Ariza Díez de Bulnes; they would have nine children.

Career as playwright and death

His work often employed "slang, puns, plays on words, caricature, parody, and dramatic tricks". He was the inventor of a new genre of comic theatre, the astracanada, the most celebrated example of which is La venganza de Don Mendo, a satire of the romances popular in Spain at the turn of the century.

Muñoz Seca's popularity grew after the premiere of La venganza de Don Mendo. Many of his later plays were very successful, including La pluma verde (1922), Los chatos (1924), La tela (1925), and Los extremeños se tocan (1927) (all written in collaboration with Pedro Pérez Fernández, but who contributed little to the works). These works shifted away from costumbrismo toward Muñoz Seca's trademark astracanada.

After the establishment of the Second Spanish Republic in 1931, Muñoz Seca was at the height of his career, though his dramatic output slowed.  Major works during this period include La voz de su amo (1933), Anacleto se divorcia (1932), La EME (1934), and La plasmatoria (1935). Muñoz Seca was a royalist and friend of Alfonso XIII, and his plays La oca (1931) and Jabalí (1932) sharply criticized the Second Republic. In July 1936, after the outbreak of the Spanish Civil War, he was arrested in Barcelona; he was later transported to Madrid. A humorist to the end, he said to his court-martial, "You can take my hacienda, my land, my wealth, even—as you are going to do—my life. But there is one thing that you cannot take from me—the fear that I have!" On 28 November 1936 he was executed by a Spanish Republican Army firing squad in the Paracuellos massacre. His final words, addressed to the firing squad, were "I am starting to believe you are not intending to count me among your friends!"

Legacy

The Pedro Muñoz Seca Municipal Theater in El Puerto de Santa María and the Muñoz Seca Theater in Madrid are named in Muñoz Seca's honor.

In 1995, the Pedro Muñoz Seca Foundation (Fundación Pedro Muñoz Seca) was established; it is sponsored by descendants of the author and by the government of El Puerto de Santa Maria.  The foundation maintains a small museum devoted to the author in his former family home in El Puerto de Santa Maria.

Muñoz Seca is the grandfather of Spanish writer and journalist Alfonso Ussía.

Dramatic works 

 República estudiantil
 El espanto de Toledo
 La novela de Rosario
 Las inyecciones
 ¡Usted es Ortiz!
 Calamar
 El alfiler
 ¡Pégame, Luciano!
 Satanelo
 ¡Un! ¡Dos! ¡Tres!... ¡La niña para usted!
 ¡Todo para ti!
 El drama de Adán
 Una que no sirve
 Equilibrios
 ¡Te quiero, Pepe!
 Bronca en el ocho
 El refugio
 Los quince millones
 La Eme
 El gran ciudadano
 El rey negro
 ¡¡Cataplum!!
 ¡Sola!
 Las cuatro paredes
 El verdugo de Sevilla
 La venganza de Don Mendo
 Los extremeños se tocan
 La Oca
 Anacleto se divorcia
 El último pecado
 La razón de la locura
 ¡Por peteneras!
 La canción húngara
 Coba Fina
 Las cosas de la vida
 El medio ambiente
 La Nicotina
 Trampa y cartón
 El milagro del santo
 López de Coria
 El incendio de Roma
 Cachivache
 Naide es ná
 La perla ambarina
 Lolita Tenorio
 El marido de la Engracia
 Albi-Melén
 El voto de Santiago
 El teniente alcalde de Zalamea
 De rodillas a tus pies
 La fórmula 3k3
 Los rifeños
 Un drama de Calderón
 Trianerías
 Las verónicas
 La Tiziana
 El mal rato
 Los amigos del alma
 Pepe Conde o el mentir de las estrellas
 Martinglas
 El clima de Pamplona
 San Pérez
 El parque de Sevilla
 La hora del reparto
 Tirios y troyanos
 El número 15
 De lo vivo a lo pintado
 ¡Plancha!
 El Goya
 La pluma verde
 El rey nuevo
 La mujer de nieve
 Los chatos
 Bartolo tiene una flauta
 La tela
 Los campanilleros
 El sonámbulo
 La cabalgata de los Reyes
 María Fernández
 Seguidilla gitana
 El voto
 La caraba
 La mala uva
 La Lola
 El rajáh de Cochin
 Ali-Gui
 ¡Un millón!
 El sofá, la radio, el peque y la hija de Palomeque
 ¿Qué tienes en la mirada?
 Los ilustres gañanes
 El cuatrigémino
 La perulera
 Una mujer decidida
 El alma de corcho
 Mi padre
 El corzo
 ¡No hay no!
 Jabalí
 Trastos viejos
 La voz de su amo
 El Ex...
 Mi chica
 El escándalo
 ¡Soy un sinvergüenza!
 Papeles
 Marcelino fue por vino
 La plasmatoria
 Zape
 Las guerreras
 El contrabando
 De balcón en balcón
 Las tres cosas de Jérez
 El lagar
 El jilguerillo de los parrales
 La neurastenia de Satanás
 La cucaña de Solarillo
 Fúcar XXI
 Pastor y Borrego
 La niña de las planchas
 La frescura de Lafuente
 La casa de los crímenes
 La Remolino
 El castillo de los ultrajes
 La escala de Milán
 La conferencia de Algeciras
 El último Bravo
 Los cuatro Robinsones
 La mujer
 El rayo
 Poca cosa es un hombre
 La cura
 El clamor
 La Academia
 La tonta del rizo
 Las cuatro paredes (posthumous, premiered in 1940)

Footnotes

References

Works cited

Further reading

External links
 
 Official Web Page - Fundación Pedro Muñoz Seca 
 

1879 births
1936 deaths
Executed writers
People executed by Spain by firing squad
Spanish dramatists and playwrights
Spanish male dramatists and playwrights
Spanish monarchists
Spanish people of the Spanish Civil War (National faction)
Executed Spanish people
People killed by the Second Spanish Republic
People from El Puerto de Santa María